MacGregor is a Scottish surname. The name is Anglicised form of the Scottish Gaelic MacGriogair. The Gaelic name was originally a patronym, and means "son of Griogar". The Gaelic personal name Griogar is a Gaelicised form of the name Gregory. The surname is used by members of the Scottish clan Clan Gregor, also known as Clan MacGregor. 

The surname was banned in Scotland several times prior to the 18th century, in an effort to clamp down on the unruly clan.

Notable people 
 Alasdair Alpin MacGregor (1899–1970), writer and photographer
 Andrew MacGregor (1897–1983), World War I flying ace
 Brad MacGregor (born 1964), Canadian ice hockey player
 Byron MacGregor (1948–1995), Canadian news anchor
 Chummy MacGregor (1903–1973), jazz pianist and songwriter
 Clark MacGregor (1922–2003), U.S. politician
 Clifford J. MacGregor (1904–1985), American meteorologist and Arctic explorer
 David MacGregor (born 1983), Scottish musician
 Douglas Macgregor, military writer
 Elizabeth Ann Macgregor (born 1958), Scottish curator and art historian
 Gregor MacGregor (1869–1919), cricketer
 Gregor MacGregor (1786–1845), adventurer and confidence trickster
 Sir Ian Kinloch MacGregor (1912–1998), British industrialist
 Ian Macgregor (born 1937), accountant and charity finance guru
 James Mor MacGregor (1695–1754), the eldest son of Rob Roy and a major during the rising of '45
 Joanna MacGregor (born 1959), classical pianist
 John MacGregor (disambiguation), multiple people
 Judith Macgregor (born 1952), British diplomat
 Katherine MacGregor (1925–2018), television actress
 Kino MacGregor (born 1977), Ashtanga Yoga teacher, author and influencer.
 Mary MacGregor (born 1948), singer
 Neil MacGregor (born 1946), art historian and museum director
 Robert Roy MacGregor ("Rob Roy", 1671–1734), Scottish outlaw and folk hero
 Sara Macgregor (died 1919), British painter
 Sue MacGregor (born 1941), writer and broadcaster
 William MacGregor (1846–1919), British imperial administrator

See also
McGregor (surname)

Anglicised Scottish Gaelic-language surnames
Scottish surnames
Patronymic surnames
Surnames from given names